Sorbus splendens, a species in the Rosaceae, is a tree that grows to around  tall that occurs in mixed forests and on mountain slopes in China. It is endemic to that nation, but has been introduced to the United Kingdom and North America as an ornamental.

References

splendens
Endemic flora of China
Trees of China
Vulnerable plants